Sahali (As Sahili) is a town in eastern Tunisia.

Populated places in Tunisia